Middleton is an unincorporated community in Columbiana County, in the U.S. state of Ohio.

History
Middleton was among the first settlements made in Fairfield Township. A variant name of Middleton was Mosk. The Mosk post office was established in 1882, and remained in operation until 1902.

References

Unincorporated communities in Columbiana County, Ohio
Unincorporated communities in Ohio
1882 establishments in Ohio
Populated places established in 1882